Fox Covert is a  nature reserve near Royston in North Hertfordshire. It is owned and managed by the Herts and Middlesex Wildlife Trust.

The site is mature beech woodland, planted in the nineteenth century, and ground flora includes many white helleborine orchids. It has deer and many species of birds. It was the Trust's first reserve, donated by Mr Fordham of Letchworth in 1964.

Fox Covert borders Therfield Heath Site of Special Scientific Interest, and the Hertfordshire Way long distance footpath passes through it.

References

Herts and Middlesex Wildlife Trust reserves
North Hertfordshire District